Cubavision  is a Cuban television channel owned by the Cuban government. It airs nationally 24 hours a day and has a cable version with a global reach called Cubavision International.

History 
The origins of Cubavision go back to December 10, 1950, with the first transmissions of CMQ-TV, channel 6. This commercial channel started its regular transmissions on March 11, 1951.

In 1959, with the conclusion of the Cuban Revolution, CMQ-TV, like the other means of communication in the country, ended up under the control of the government. Subsequently, on February 27, 1961, with the disappearance of commercial advertising in Cuban media, the Cuban Government assumed the financing of the television channels.

In 1967, the first Telecenters (regional centers of television) were born and the use of video tape was introduced. In 1971, Cubavisión began its color broadcasts, and in the following years began to develop satellite transmissions, including the beginning of Cubavisión Internacional in 1986.

References

Television in Cuba
Television channels and stations established in 1950